Chinese Puzzle may refer to:
 The Chinese Puzzle (play), a play by Frances Barclay and Leon M. Lion
 The Chinese Puzzle (1919 film), a 1919 film adaptation
 The Chinese Puzzle (1932 film), a 1932 film adaptation starring Austin Trevor
 The Chinese Puzzle (2013 film), a 2013 French language film
 The Chinese Puzzle (TV series), a 1974 British children's television series
 Chinese Puzzle, a 2013 song by Kraked Unit

See also
 Puzzle box
 Mechanical puzzle
 Chinese finger puzzle
 Chinese rings puzzle
 Puzzles